Love, Charlie: The Rise and Fall of Chef Charlie Trotter is a 2021 American documentary film directed by Rebecca Halpern. The documentary is about the life of chef Charlie Trotter. Love, Charlie had its world premiere at the 57th Annual Chicago International Film Festival, where it won the Best of the Fest Award.

Synopsis
Created and culled from personal and family archival video and film footage, letters written to friends, family members, and loved ones, and a wide range of interviews, including ones with fellow chefs, Love, Charlie explores the ascent, descent, and legacy of the late Charlie Trotter.

Release 
Love, Charlie had its premiere at the Chicago International Film Festival in 2021.

The documentary also screened at Florida Film Festival and Seattle International Film Festival.

Reception 
Love, Charlie opened to positive reviews from critics. Chicago Sun-Times film critic Richard Roeper called it “One of the best documentaries of the year.” Michael Phillips of Chicago Tribune called it "the first fully successful documentary about a high-flying Chicago chef’s triumph and torment.”

References

External links
 
 
 

2021 films
2021 documentary films
Cooking films
American documentary films
2020s English-language films
2020s American films